Jean-Nicolas Carrière (born October 3, 1985) is a former Canadian football linebacker in the Canadian Football League. He was drafted in the third round with the 21st overall pick in the 2008 CFL Draft by the Toronto Argonauts and played the 2008 CFL season for them.

On July 9, 2009, Carrière was released by the Argonauts.

Carrière played CIS Football for the McGill Redmen.

Further reading

References

External links
Toronto Argonauts bio

1985 births
Living people
Canadian football linebackers
Toronto Argonauts players
McGill Redbirds football players
Franco-Ontarian people
Players of Canadian football from Ontario
People from Clarence-Rockland